Niphona picticornis is a species of beetle in the family Cerambycidae. It was described by Étienne Mulsant in 1839. It has a wide distribution in Europe. It feeds on Euphorbia dendroides, Castanea sativa, Pistacia terebinthus, Pistacia lentiscus, and Phoenix canariensis. It acts as a host for the parasitic wasp Xorides propinquus.

References

picticornis
Beetles described in 1839